FK Vysoké Tatry – Starý Smokovec is a Slovak football team, based in the town of Starý Smokovec. The club was founded in 1997.

Current squad

References

External links 
at vysoketatry.sk 

Vysoke Tatry - Stary Smokovec